Gmina Lipno may refer to either of the following rural administrative districts in Poland:
Gmina Lipno, Greater Poland Voivodeship
Gmina Lipno, Kuyavian-Pomeranian Voivodeship